Elionurus is a genus of Asian, African, Australian, and Neotropical plants in the grass family.

 Species

 formerly included
see Bothriochloa Lasiurus Loxodera Phacelurus Schizachyrium Urelytrum

References

Andropogoneae
Poaceae genera
Taxa named by Alexander von Humboldt
Taxa named by Aimé Bonpland